Raymond Fabien (born 1 October 1945 in Port-of-Spain) is a retired sprinter from Trinidad and Tobago.

He competed in 4 x 100 metres relay at the 1968 Olympic Games, but the team consisting of Fabien, Carl Archer, Edwin Roberts and Winston Short was knocked out in the semi-final. Fabien later competed in both 100 metres and relay at the 1971 Pan American Games, but without reaching the final.

References
Best of Trinidad

1945 births
Living people
Trinidad and Tobago male sprinters
Athletes (track and field) at the 1968 Summer Olympics
Olympic athletes of Trinidad and Tobago
Athletes (track and field) at the 1967 Pan American Games
Athletes (track and field) at the 1971 Pan American Games
Pan American Games competitors for Trinidad and Tobago